Wendy Piltz (born 24 August 1956) is an Australian former cricketer who played as a right-arm medium bowler. She appeared in one Test match and three One Day Internationals for Australia in 1984, all against India. She played domestic cricket for South Australia.

After her cricket career, she became a physical education educator and author.

Sporting career
Piltz represented Australia and South Australia in Lacrosse and Cricket during the 1980s and 1990s as well as district representation in Basketball and Netball. Piltz's international cricket career included one Test and three ODIs for Australia in a tour of India in 1984 as well as being a state representative during the 1980s. Piltz has continued to participate as a player, coach, referee and administrator in community sport throughout her life and is currently coaching the women's team at North Adelaide Lacrosse Club.

Education career

Piltz commenced a Diploma of Teaching at the Adelaide College of Advanced Education in 1976 and then completed a Bachelor of Education in Physical Education in 1977. She completed a Master of Science at the University of Oregon in 1980. She taught HPE in State and Catholic primary and secondary schools.

Piltz began her work in teacher preparation at the University of South Australia in 1989 and her current teaching responsibilities are in the Human Movement program and in the Bachelor of Education programs that prepare prim/middle/sec teachers in Health and Physical Education. Piltz's teaching focus is on pedagogy in health and physical education, group dynamics and Choice Theory and her work includes co-authoring "Play Practice" with mentor and elite coach, Alan Launder. Piltz's program provides extensive hands-on lab school opportunities for beginning health and physical education teachers which both models and teaches best practice pedagogy to future teachers.

Piltz has built a National & International reputation working with Government and community agencies in sport pedagogy and coach education. This includes work with Human Kinetics in the American Sport Education Program, the Australian Sports Commission, State Offices of Sport and Recreation, SA Department of Education, Training and Employment, Catholic Education Office, the Australian Football League, Women's Lacrosse Australia, Australian Touch Association, SA National Football League. She has regularly presented conference sessions on Sport Pedagogy at international and national level including the International Association for Physical Education in Higher Education AISEP.

Selected bibliography

 Piltz, W. (2003). Teaching and coaching using a play practice approach. In Teaching games for understanding in physical education and sport. (pp. 180–200). Vermont, USA: National Association for Sport and Physical Education Publications.
 Piltz, W. (2002). Case study 3 Lacrosse coaching. In Making mentors: A guide to establishing a successful mentoring program for coaches and officials (pp. 71–80). Canberra: Australian Sports Commission.
 Garrett, R. & Piltz, W. (1999). A case study of curriculum control: Curriculum reform in health and physical education. In B. Johnson & A. Reid, Contesting the curriculum (pp. 201–209). Katoomba: Social Science Press.
 Garrett, R, Wrench, A & Piltz, W. (2007). Lab School as a teaching strategy in physical education teacher education, Healthy Lifestyles Journal, (54)(2), 19–24..
 Launder, A & Piltz, W. ( 2006). Beyond 'understanding' to skilful play in games, through play practice, Journal of Physical Education New Zealand, (39)(1), pp 47–57.
 Piltz, W. & Kemp, T. (1995). Teaching personal responsibility through group adventure initiative tasks. Journal of Adventure Education and Outdoor Leadership, 12(2), 23–26.
 Santomier, J., Howard, W., Piltz, W., & Romance, T. (1980). White sock crime: Organizational deviance in inter collegiate athletics. Journal of Sport and Social Issues, 4(2), 26–32.
 Piltz, W 2008, The influence of play practice principles and processes on pre-service teachers' conceptions & capabilities in games teaching. Paper presented at the Association Internationale des Ecoles Superieures d’Education Physique (AIESEP) World Congress, Sapporo, Japan, 21-24 Jan 2008 (in press)
 Piltz, W 2008, Improving group skills, personal responsibility and team building using an interactive on line learning object. Paper presented at the Association Internationale des Ecoles Superieures d’Education Physique (AIESEP) World Congress, Sapporo, Japan, 21-24 Jan 2008 (in press)
 Piltz, W 2007, Teaching Lacrosse using games based Play Practice principles. Paper presented at the Asia-Pacific Conference on Teaching Sport and Physical Education for Understanding, Sydney, 14 – 15 Dec 2006. Available on line at: http://www.proflearn.edsw.usyd.edu.au/proceedings_resources/papers/Proceedings_TGfU_06_AsiaPacificSport.pdf pp 84–99.
 Piltz, W 2007, Influencing professional practice in games education through working models and principle based experiential learning, Paper presented at the Asia-Pacific Conference on Teaching Sport and Physical Education for Understanding, Sydney, 14 – 15 Dec 2006. Available on line at: http://www.proflearn.edsw.usyd.edu.au/proceedings_resources/papers/Proceedings_TGfU_06_AsiaPacificSport.pdf pp 100–112.
 Piltz, W. (2004). Reading the Game: A key component of effective instruction in teaching and coaching. In 2nd International Conference: Teaching games and Sport for Understanding. Available online at: http://www.conferences.unimelb.edu.au/sport/proceedings/PROCEEDINGS.pdf pp 79–89
 Piltz, W. (2002). Teaching and coaching using a play practice approach. Paper presented at the Teaching Games for Understanding Conference, New Hampshire, 1–4 August 2001.
 Piltz, W. (2002). Applying choice theory and reflection to enhance student outcomes in group dynamics. Paper presented at the 22nd Biennial National ACHPER Conference—Interaction for Healthy Solutions, Launceston, 3–6 July 2002. Launceston: Australian Council for Health, Physical Education and Recreation. Available online at: http://www.ausport.gov.au/fulltext/2002/achper/Piltz.pdf
 Piltz, W. (2002). Developing competent and confident game players using a play practice methodology. Paper presented at the 22nd Biennial National ACHPER Conference—Interaction for Healthy Solutions, Launceston, 3–6 July 2002. Launceston: Australian Council for Health, Physical Education and Recreation. Available online at: http://www.ausport.gov.au/fulltext/2002/achper/Piltz.pdf
 Piltz, W. (2002). Beyond technical or tactical—A critique of current approaches to the teaching of games: Proceedings of the 22nd Biennial National ACHPER Conference—Interaction for Healthy Solutions, Launceston, 3–6 July 2002. Launceston: Australian Council for Health, Physical Education and Recreation.
 Piltz, W. (1998). Engaging reluctant and resistant learners: Proceedings of the 21st Biennal National ACHPER Conference—Key into life, Adelaide, 12–16 January 1998 (pp. 107–109). Adelaide: Australian Council for Health, Physical Education and Recreation.
 Piltz, W. (1998). Promoting responsibility and group effectiveness: Proceedings of the 21st Biennal National ACHPER Conference—Key into life, Adelaide, 12–16 January 1998 (pp. 110–113). Adelaide: Australian Council for Health, Physical Education and Recreation.
 Piltz, W. & Garrett, R. (1998). Preparing teachers in health and physical education into the 21st century: Proceedings of the 21st Biennal National ACHPER Conference—Key into life, Adelaide, 12–16 January 1998 (pp. 114–117). Adelaide: Australian Council for Health, Physical Education and Recreation.
 Garrett, R. & Piltz, W. (1998). Curriculum reform and its impact on professional practice and identity in health and physical education (abstract). AARE conference papers on disc retrieved on 16 June 2002, from http://www.aare.edu.au/confpap.htm
 Launder, A. & Piltz, W. (1999). Becoming a better bench coach: Coaching in the game. Sports Coach, 22(1), 24–25.
 Launder, A. & Piltz, W. (1999). Becoming a better bench coach: Match analysis. Sports Coach, 21(4), 26–27.
 Piltz, W. (1999). Making sense of chaos. The Sport Educator, 11(3), 21–24.
 Piltz, W. (1999). When can we play a game? The advantages of a play practice approach for the teaching of games. ACHPER Matters (T3), 8–12.
 Piltz, W. (1998). Teaching games effectively. ACHPER Pick up and Run: 50 Ideas for Health and Physical Education, 12–14.
 Piltz, W. (1996). The name of the game is lacrosse. Aussie Sport Action, 7(2), 36–39.
 Piltz, W. (1994, May). Stepping into the 21st century. The Lacrosse Player, 5.
 Piltz, W. (1994, June). Lacrosse at the crossroads. The Lacrosse Player, 13–15.
 Launder, A. & Piltz, W. (1992, January). An innovative approach to the teaching of touch. Sportscoach, 12–17.
 Piltz, W. (1983, July). Face the fear. Time Out, South Australian Lacrosse Association, 6–7.
 Launder, A. & Piltz, W. (1996). Coach education towards 2000—The lacrosse experience; Proceedings of the National Coaching and Officiating Conference—Participation to performance, Brisbane, 30 November – 3 December 1996 (pp. 25–29), Australian Coaching Council.
 Piltz, W. (1994). Applying the A.I.M. model of coach education to lacrosse: Proceedings of the National Coaching Conference—Doing it better, Canberra, 1–3 December 1994 (pp. 153–157), Australian Coaching Council.
 Launder, A., Piltz, W., & Launder, D. (1994). It's only work if your would rather be doing something else: Proceedings of the National Coaching Conference—Doing it better, Canberra, 1–3 December 1994 (pp. 93–97), Australian Coaching Council.
 Piltz, W. (1992). Head injury and protection in women's lacrosse in Australia. Australian Sports Commission.
 Piltz, W. (1987). The optional use of protective headgear in women's lacrosse south Australia: A case study 1983–1987. Unpublished report, South Australian Women's Lacrosse Board.

References

External links
 
 
 Wendy Piltz at southernstars.org.au

1956 births
Living people
Cricketers from Adelaide
Australia women Test cricketers
Australia women One Day International cricketers
South Australian Scorpions cricketers
Australian lacrosse players